The Part of the Whole EP is the first solo ep by jazz pianist Mike Garson, and was released in 2007 via his Myspace site.

Track listing

Part of the Whole I
Part of the Whole II
Part of the Whole III
Part of the Whole IV

External links
 Part of the Whole Ep - Myspace site-  EP download
 Regenmag Review-  EP track listing and review
 mikegarson.com Official Website with Discography

Mike Garson albums
2007 EPs